The Lonely Hearts Club Tour is the second concert tour by Welsh singer-songwriter Marina Diamandis, formerly known as Marina and the Diamonds.

Background and development
The UK dates were announced on Valentine's Day with the North American dates announced in April. On 30 April 2012, it was announced that the UK segment of the tour has been rescheduled due to vocal cord condition of the artist to dates beginning on 18 June 2012. The tour ran concurrent with Coldplay's Mylo Xyloto Tour for which Marina served as an opening act. On 11 February 2013, Diamandis announced via her website and e-mail, that her European tour was cancelled. On Saturday, 4 May, Diamandis debuted the track "Electra Heart", as an interlude to her final, closing leg of the tour.

Set lists

{{hidden
| headercss = background: lavender; font-size: 100%; width: 70%;
| contentcss = text-align: left; font-size: 100%; width: 70%;
| header = Leg 1: Europe (May–July 2012)
| content = 
"Homewrecker"
"Oh No!"
"Mowgli's Road"
"Lies"
"I Am Not a Robot"
"The State of Dreaming"
"Power & Control"
"Bubblegum Bitch"
"Starring Role"
"Obsessions"
"Living Dead"
"Primadonna"
"Shampain"
"Radioactive"

Encore
"Teen Idle"
"Fear and Loathing"
"Hollywood"
}}
{{hidden
| headercss = background: lavender; font-size: 100%; width: 70%;
| contentcss = text-align: left; font-size: 100%; width: 70%;
| header = Leg 2: North America (July–August 2012)
| content = 
"Homewrecker"
"Oh No!"
"Mowgli's Road"
"Lies"
"I Am Not a Robot"
"The State of Dreaming"
"Power & Control"
"Bubblegum Bitch"
"Starring Role"
"Obsessions"
"Hypocrates"
"Primadonna"
"Shampain"
"Hollywood"
"Radioactive"

Encore
"Teen Idle"
"Fear and Loathing"
"How to Be a Heartbreaker"
}}
{{hidden
| headercss = background: lavender; font-size: 100%; width: 70%;
| contentcss = text-align: left; font-size: 100%; width: 70%;
| header = Leg 3: Europe (September–November 2012)
| content =
"Homewrecker"
"Oh No!"
"Mowgli's Road"
"Lies"
"I Am Not a Robot"
"The State of Dreaming"
"Power & Control"
"Bubblegum Bitch"
"Starring Role"
"Obsessions"
"Valley of the Dolls"
"Primadonna"
"Shampain"
"Hollywood"
"Radioactive"
"Fear and Loathing"

Encore
"Teen Idle"
"How to Be a Heartbreaker"
}}
{{hidden
| headercss = background: lavender; font-size: 100%; width: 70%;
| contentcss = text-align: left; font-size: 100%; width: 70%;
| header = Leg 4: North America (December 2012)
| content = 
"Homewrecker"
"Oh No!"
"Mowgli's Road"
"Lies"
"I Am Not a Robot"
"The State of Dreaming"
"Power & Control"
"Bubblegum Bitch"
"Starring Role"
"Obsessions"
"Hollywood"
"Sex Yeah"
"Shampain"
"Radioactive"
"Primadonna"
"Fear and Loathing"

Encore
"Teen Idle"
"How to Be a Heartbreaker"
}}
{{hidden
| headercss = background: lavender; font-size: 100%; width: 70%;
| contentcss = text-align: left; font-size: 100%; width: 70%;
| header = Leg 5: North America (May 2013)
| content = 
"Electra Heart" (intro)
"Homewrecker"
"Oh No!"
"Bubblegum Bitch"
"I Am Not a Robot"
"Lies"
"The State of Dreaming"
"Power & Control"
"Mowgli's Road"
"Starring Role"
"Obsessions"
"Numb"
"Radioactive"
"Shampain"
"Primadonna"
"Hollywood"
"Fear and Loathing"

Encore
"Teen Idle"
"How to Be a Heartbreaker"
}}

Notes 
At the 29 and 30 June 2012 shows, "How to Be a Heartbreaker" was performed between "Primadonna" and "Shampain".
"Lonely Hearts Club" was performed as the opening song at the following 2012 dates: 30 September, 2, 4, 5, 6, 8, 14 and 15 October.
"Hypocrates" was performed as the second song of the encore at the 9, 11 and  13 October 2012 dates.
At the 14 October 2012 show, "Living Dead" was performed as the second song of the encore.
"E.V.O.L" was performed at the 20 May 2013 date between "Radioactive" and "Shampain".

Opening acts
Meredith Sheldon Leg 1: United Kingdom
MS MR Leg 1: North America
Foe Leg 2: United Kingdom
Foxes Leg 2: United Kingdom
Icona Pop Leg 2: North America
Charli XCX Leg 3: North America
Little Daylight (Dates without Charli XCX) Leg 3: North America

Tour dates

A ^ Boston Calling Music Festival Show

Box office score data

References

Marina Diamandis concert tours
2012 concert tours
2013 concert tours
Concert tours of Canada
Concert tours of Europe
Concert tours of Germany
Concert tours of Ireland
Concert tours of North America
Concert tours of the United Kingdom
Concert tours of the United States